Tromp is a Dutch occupational surname thought to be derived from trompet(ter), trumpet (player), or sometimes trommelaar, drummer.

Tromp may also refer to:

People with the surname
 Chadwick Tromp (born 1995), Aruban baseball player
 Cornelis Tromp (1629–1691), Dutch admiral, son of Maarten Tromp
 Esra Tromp (born 1990), Dutch racing cyclist
 Felipe Tromp (1917–1995), first Governor of Aruba
  (1828–1900), Dutch politician and minister
 Gerrit Tromp (1901–1938), Dutch rower
 Gretha Tromp (born 1964), Dutch sprinter and hurdler
 Henricus Tromp (1878–1962), Dutch rower
  (born 1953), Dutch association football referee
 Johann Tromp (born 1990), Namibian rugby union player
 John Tromp, Dutch computer scientist
 Lionel Tromp (born 1984), Aruban footballer
 Maarten Tromp (1598–1653), Dutch admiral
 Marlene Tromp, American academic administrator
 Nadia Tromp (born 1977), South African architect
 Ruud Tromp (born 1954), Dutch-born American semiconductor physicist
 Ryan Tromp (born 1973), Aruban footballer
 Sebastiaan Tromp (1889–1975), Dutch Jesuit priest, theologian, and Latinist
 Solco Walle Tromp (1909–1983), Dutch geologist and biometeorologist
 Theodoor Philibert Tromp (1903–1984), Dutch politician and engineer

See also 
 Tromp (disambiguation)
 Trump (surname)

References

Dutch-language surnames